Over Dinsdale is a small village and civil parish in the Local Government District of Hambleton in North Yorkshire, England. The population of the village (including Girsby) taken at the 2011 census was 151. The village straddles an ancient Roman road on the border with County Durham, on a peninsula in the River Tees, approximately 6 miles from Darlington and 8.5 miles from Yarm. The Teesdale Way passes through the village.

Historically the village was a township in the ancient parish of Sockburn, a parish divided by the River Tees between the North Riding of Yorkshire (which included Over Dinsdale) and County Durham (which included the township of Sockburn).  Over Dinsdale became a separate civil parish in 1866.

The neighbouring village of Low Dinsdale is across the river in County Durham.

References

External links 

Hambleton District Council

Villages in North Yorkshire
Civil parishes in North Yorkshire
Hambleton District